Gordon's sign is a clinical sign in which squeezing the calf muscle elicits an extensor plantar reflex. It is found in patients with pyramidal tract lesions, and is one of a number of Babinski-like responses.

The sign is named after Alfred Gordon.

References 

Symptoms and signs: Nervous system
Reflexes